João de Deus Ramos Ponces de Carvalho (born 17 March 1957 in Lisbon) is a Portuguese film director.

His great-grandfather was the poet João de Deus. 
He went to the University of Lisbon, obtaining a License in History, specialty, Art History.
He started taking still pictures when he was 10, and became a publicity photographer by 17. His first documentary film was made at 22, being one of the first TV programs to represent Portugal in MIPCOM, Cannes, 1980.

References

Portuguese film directors
Living people
1957 births